Calcimitra arnoldeyasi is a species of sea snail, a marine gastropod mollusk in the family Mitridae, the miters or miter snails.

Description

Distribution

References

 Poppe G. & Tagaro S. (2010) New species of Haloceratidae, Columbellidae, Buccinidae, Mitridae, Costellariidae, Amathinidae and Spondylidae from the Philippines. Visaya 3(1):73–93
 Poppe, Tagaro & Salisbury (2009). Visaya Suppl. 4 : 3–86

Mitridae
Gastropods described in 2009